Banita Sandhu (born 22 June 1997) is a Welsh actress who primarily works in Indian films. She made her film debut in the 2018 Hindi film October and went on to star in the Tamil film Adithya Varma and the American science fiction series Pandora (both 2019).

Early life and education 
Sandhu was born and brought up in Caerleon, Wales to first-generation British Indian parents. She moved to London at 18 to start her degree in English Literature at King's College London. She started acting at the age of 11.  She was head girl at Rougemont School, Newport.

Career 
Sandhu appeared in an advert for Wrigley Company's Doublemint which had the song "Ek Ajnabee Haseena Se" as the background score; and another advert, for Vodafone India, which was broadcast during the Indian Premier League cricket season. Her first feature film was October, starring Varun Dhawan, which released in 2018. This was followed by the American TV series Pandora, and the Tamil film Adithya Varma in 2019. She later signed on the Hindi film Sardar Udham Singh and the British film Kavita and Teresa.

Filmography

Films

Television

Music video

References

External links 

 

1997 births
Living people
Actresses in Hindi cinema
Actresses in Tamil cinema
Alumni of King's College London
British actresses of Indian descent
British expatriate actresses in India
British film actresses
European actresses in India
People from Caerleon
Welsh people of Indian descent
21st-century British actresses